Helene Magdalena Hofknecht (19 February 1929 – 5 September 2021) was a German athlete. She competed in the women's long jump at the 1952 Summer Olympics.

References

External links
 

1929 births
2021 deaths
Athletes (track and field) at the 1952 Summer Olympics
German female long jumpers
Olympic athletes of Germany
Sportspeople from Bayreuth